Ann Arbor Charter Township is a charter township of Washtenaw County in the U.S. state of Michigan.  The population was 4,673 at the 2020 census.  The township borders the city of Ann Arbor and contains numerous exclaves, but the two are administered autonomously.

Communities
 Barton Hills is a village within the township.
The settlement began around 1877 as the site of Cornwell Mills. While it was also referred to as Cornwell and Newport, it became more known as Foster after pioneering settler Samuel Foster.
The area was first settled by Orrin White and his family in 1824, and the community grew in a few years when more families moved to the area. A post office named Geddes opened on July 21, 1875 and was named after its first postmaster John Geddes. The post office only operated for two months and closed on September 21, 1875. The community became a station along the Michigan Central Railroad in 1878, and the Ypsilanti Paper Company operated a pulp mill along the river. The post office was restored and operated from May 3, 1894 until July 31, 1901.

History
The "Township of Ann Arbour" was organized in 1827 by the Legislative Council of the Michigan Territory and the Village of Ann Arbour, which later became the City of Ann Arbor, was organized in 1833.  As villages remain part of the township, the village of Ann Arbour did not become completely detached from the township until it reorganized as the city of Ann Arbor.

Geography

The Huron River flows through the township and contains Geddes Dam in the southeastern portion.  The Border-to-Border Trail runs through the southeast edge of township along the river near Geddes Dam.  Barton Dam is within the city limits of Ann Arbor, but the township contains boundaries along the dam's Barton Pond reservoir.

Major highways
 runs through the township and forms part of the border with the city of Ann Arbor.
 is a business loop that runs briefly through the township before merging with US 23.
 runs through the township and runs concurrently with US 23 and also with Bus. US 23 for portions of its route.

Demographics
As of the census of 2000, there were 4,720 people, 1,972 households, and 1,317 families residing in the township. The racial makeup of the township was 81.21% White, 2.25% African American, 0.17% Native American, 13.58% Asian, 0.06% Pacific Islander, 0.85% from other races, and 1.89% from two or more races. Hispanic or Latino of any race were 2.22% of the population.

There were 1,972 households, out of which 27.7% had children under the age of 18 living with them, 61.0% were married couples living together, 4.4% had a female householder with no husband present, and 33.2% were non-families. 26.7% of all households were made up of individuals, and 4.8% had someone living alone who was 65 years of age or older.  The average household size was 2.32 and the average family size was 2.84.

In the township the population was spread out, with 21.1% under the age of 18, 4.6% from 18 to 24, 30.9% from 25 to 44, 28.1% from 45 to 64, and 15.2% who were 65 years of age or older.  The median age was 41 years. For every 100 females, there were 95.4 males.  For every 100 females age 18 and over, there were 93.7 males.

The median income for a household in the township was $86,797, and the median income for a family was $103,102. Males had a median income of $75,176 versus $45,320 for females. The per capita income for the township was $56,084.  About 1.2% of families and 3.2% of the population were below the poverty line, including 1.7% of those under age 18 and 1.6% of those age 65 or over.

Economy
Domino's Pizza has its headquarters in the township.

In 2007 Toyota employed 932 people at the Toyota Technical Center in Ann Arbor Township. Calty Design Research Inc., a Toyota design firm, has the Calty Design Research at Ann Arbor in the township. Con-way moved its headquarters from San Mateo, California to Ann Arbor Township in 2011.

Education
Ann Arbor Charter Township is served entirely by Ann Arbor Public Schools.  The main campus of Washtenaw Community College is located in the southeastern corner of the township.

Images

References

Sources

External links

Ann Arbor Charter Township official website

Townships in Washtenaw County, Michigan
Charter townships in Michigan
1827 establishments in Michigan Territory
Populated places established in 1827